Wirnpa is a rainmaking snake who according to Aboriginal legend created the land around the Percival Lakes in Wirnpa country, Australia in the Dreamtime and whose image was used to repel outsiders.

References

Australian Aboriginal legendary creatures
Legendary serpents